Markell A. Jones (born September 26, 1996) is a former American football running back for the Purdue Boilermakers. He rushed for 72 yards and a touchdown on twelve carries (6.0 yards per carry) in his first college game on September 6, 2015.

Early years

A native of Columbus, Indiana, Jones attended Columbus East High School in that city. As a high school junior in 2013, he rushed for over 2,600 yards and 42 touchdowns while helping Columbus East to a state championship. On June 24, 2014, Jones committed to playing football at Purdue University with an announcement on Twitter. Jones stated, "Just because there's no other place,  another school that is better for me than Purdue." Jones also announced his plans to enroll at Purdue in January, 2015. As a high school senior in 2014, he rushed for a state record of 3,565 yards and 60 touchdowns and completed two passes for 80 yards and two touchdowns. Jones' record-shattering year concluded with the winning of the Indiana Mr. Football Award.

Purdue University

2015 season
Jones' early enrollment helped him earn repetitions with the first and second teams prior to Purdue's season opener. On September 6, 2015, Jones appeared in his first game at Purdue. Jones ran for 72 yards and scored a rushing touchdown. Jones set a true freshman record with 875 rushing yards and 11 total touchdowns at Purdue.

2016 season
Prior to the start of the 2016 season, Jones was named to the Doak Walker Award watch list.

Statistics
Source:

References

External links
Purdue Boilermakers bio

Living people
1996 births
American football running backs
Purdue Boilermakers football players
Players of American football from Indiana
People from Columbus, Indiana